Cyocyphax praonetoides is a species of beetle in the family Cerambycidae, and the only species in the genus Cyocyphax. It was described by Thomson in 1878.

References

Desmiphorini
Beetles described in 1878
Monotypic Cerambycidae genera